Hibbertia platyphylla is a species of flowering plant in the family Dilleniaceae and is endemic to south-eastern South Australia. It is a shrub with linear stem leaves and yellow flowers arranged singly in leaf axils with ten to fifteen stamens arranged on one side of two carpels.

Description

Taxonomy
Hibbertia platyphylla was first formally described in 2010 by Hellmut R. Toelken in the Journal of the Adelaide Botanic Gardens from specimens he collected near the Foul Bay Road in 1994. The specific epithet (platyphylla) means "broad- or flat-leaved".

In the same journal, Toelken changed the name of Hibbertia sericea var. major of John McConnell Black to Hibbertia platyphylla subsp. major and described two new subspecies, the three new names now accepted by the Australian Plant Census:
 Hibbertia platyphylla sub. platyphylla Toelken has more or less glabrous branches and the flowers single or in loose clusters mainly from August to November.

Distribution and habitat
Subspecies halmaturorum usually grows in mallee and mainly occurs in the western parts of Kangaroo Island. Subspecies major often grows on rocky slopes in woodland on the south-east coast of South Australia but also on the Eyre Peninsula and scattered parts of the central Yorke Peninsula. Subspecies platyphylla often grows near surface limestone and is found on the coast, southern Yorke Peninsula and south-eastern Eyre Peninsula.

See also
List of Hibbertia species

References

platyphylla
Flora of South Australia
Plants described in 2010
Taxa named by Hellmut R. Toelken